Vanderpump Rules is an American reality television series which has been broadcast on Bravo since January 7, 2013. Developed as the first spin-off from The Real Housewives of Beverly Hills, it has aired nine seasons and focuses on Lisa Vanderpump and the staff at her restaurants and bars; SUR Restaurant & Lounge, Pump Restaurant and Tom Tom Restaurant & Bar, in West Hollywood, California.

The success of the show has resulted in two spin-offs; Vanderpump Rules After Show and Vanderpump Rules: Jax And Brittany Take Kentucky.

Overview
Vanderpump Rules follows Lisa Vanderpump and the staff at her restaurants and bars; SUR Restaurant & Lounge, Pump Restaurant and Tom Tom Restaurant & Bar, in West Hollywood, California, as they work on building their futures in show business and become entangled in interpersonal drama.

The show initially centered on new server Scheana and her relationships with established employees: Kristen Doute, Katie Maloney, Tom Sandoval, Stassi Schroeder and Jax Taylor.

Season 1 
The first season aired from January 7 to March 11, 2013. The original cast consisted of Kristen Doute, Katie Maloney, Tom Sandoval, Stassi Schroeder, Scheana, Jax Taylor and Lisa Vanderpump, as series regulars, with Peter Madrigal, Tom Schwartz, Mike Shay, Laura-Leigh and Frank Herlihy, as recurring cast members. Ariana Madix made guest appearances in the season.

During the February 4, 2013, Watch What Happens Live! episode, Andy Cohen announced that there would be a reunion. The reunion was filmed on February 9, 2013.

In April 2013, it was announced that the show had been renewed for a second season.

Season 2 
The second season aired from November 4, 2013 to February 25, 2014. Kristina Kelly and Ariana Madix are introduced as recurring cast members. James Kennedy made guest appearances in the season.

The season premiere features as a two-hour crossover episode with the fourth-season premiere of The Real Housewives of Beverly Hills.

In April 2014, it was announced that the show had been renewed for a third season.

Season 3 
The third season aired from November 3, 2014 to March 25, 2015. Ariana Madix and Tom Schwartz are promoted to series regulars, while James Kennedy and Vail Bloom are introduced as recurring cast members.

In July 2015, it was announced that the show had been renewed for a fourth season.

Season 4 
The fourth season aired from November 2, 2015 to April 11, 2016. James Kennedy is promoted to a series regular, while Faith Stowers and Lala Kent are introduced as recurring cast members. In a recurring capacity, Brittany Cartwright, and Stassi Schroeder (who departed the show at the end of season three) made guest appearances in the season.

In April 2016, it was announced that the show had been renewed for a fifth season.

Season 5 
The fifth season aired from November 7, 2016 to April 17, 2017. Stassi Schroeder returned as a series regular, while Brittany Cartwright is introduced as a recurring cast member. Kristina Kelly and Raquel Leviss made guest appearances in the season.

On January 9, 2017, the tenth episode "Summer House Rules" served as a cross-over preview to Summer House.

In April 2017, it was announced that the show had been renewed for a sixth season.

Season 6 
The sixth season aired from December 4, 2017 to May 28, 2018. Brittany Cartwright and Lala Kent are promoted to series regulars, while Billie Lee and Raquel Leviss are introduced as recurring cast members. Mike Shay, Kristina Kelly and Faith Stowers made guest appearances in the season.

In April 2018, it was announced that the show had been renewed for a seventh season.

Season 7 
The seventh season aired from December 3, 2018 to May 20, 2019. Beau Clark is introduced as a recurring cast member. Kristina Kelly, Max Boyens and Dayna Kathan made guest appearances in the season.

During the season, Lisa Vanderpump and Ken Todd partnered with cast members Tom Sandoval and Tom Schwartz to open a new restaurant/bar in West Hollywood, California, Tom Tom Restaurant & Bar.

Season 8 
The eighth season aired from January 7 to June 16, 2020. Beau Clark is promoted to a series regular, along with Max Boyens, Brett Caprioni and Dayna Kathan also added as series regulars, while Charli Burnett, Danica Dow and Brett Willis are introduced as recurring cast members. Randall Emmett made guest appearances in the season.

Due to the COVID-19 pandemic, the reunion was recorded virtually, on Zoom.

On June 9, 2020, it was announced original cast members Kristen Doute and Stassi Schroeder had been fired following accusations by former co-star Faith Stowers, who claimed that the two women filed a false police report against her for a crime she did not commit. Additionally, it was announced Max Boyens and Brett Caprioni would not return for the ninth season following past racist Twitter posts.

On December 4, 2020, Jax Taylor and Brittany Cartwright were also fired from the show.

Season 9 
In December 2020, following the departures of several cast members and due to challenges associated with the COVID-19 pandemic, production on season nine was put on hold 'indefinitely'.

On April 27, 2021, the network confirmed that the show would return for a ninth season as well as confirming that Lisa Vanderpump, Maloney, Sandoval, Scheana, Madix, Schwartz, Kennedy, Kent and Leviss would be returning to the show as cast members.

In April 2021, Dayna Kathan confirmed that she would not be returning for the ninth season while suggesting that production on the show was to resume in the near future.

In May 2021, production resumed for the ninth season.

The ninth season aired from September 28, 2021 to January 26, 2022. Charli Burnett and Raquel Leviss are promoted to series regulars, along with Brock Davies also added as a series regular, while Richardson Chery, Randall Emmett, Corey Loftus and Max Todd are introduced as recurring cast members.

In May 2022, it was announced that the show had been renewed for a tenth season.

Season 10 
On December 4, 2022, Randall Emmett revealed that he will not return for the tenth season, and claimed he "never wanted to be on" the show in the first place. On December 29, 2022, Brock Davies announced that he will feature in a reduced role during the tenth season.

Cast

Timeline of cast

Main cast
 Lisa Vanderpump: (2013–present), co-owner of SUR Restaurant & Lounge and Tom Tom Restaurant & Bar, and owner of Pump Restaurant
 Katie Maloney: (2013–present), a former server at SUR
 Tom Sandoval: (2013–present), a former bartender at SUR, author, now Lisa and Ken's business partner at Tom Tom 
 Scheana: (2013–present), a former server at SUR, and an aspiring singer and actress, married to Brock Davies
 Ariana Madix: (2014–present), a former bartender at SUR, and an author, in a relationship with Tom Sandoval
 Tom Schwartz: (2013–present), a former bartender at Pump, model and actor, now Lisa and Ken's business partner at Tom Tom
 James Kennedy: (2013–present), a former busboy at SUR, now DJ
 Lala Kent: (2015–present), a former hostess at SUR, who volunteers at Vanderpump Dogs, mother of Ocean
 Charli Burnett: (2020–present), a server at SUR, in a relationship with Corey Loftus
 Raquel Leviss: (2017–present), a former server at SUR, who volunteers at Vanderpump Dogs

Recurring cast
 Ken Todd: (2013–present), co-owner of SUR Restaurant & Lounge and Tom Tom Restaurant & Bar, and owner of Pump Restaurant, husband to Lisa
 Guillermo Zapata: (2013–present), co-owner of SUR Restaurant and Lounge, a model and actor, married to Nathalie Zapata
 Nathalie Zapata: (2013–present), co-owner of SUR Restaurant & Lounge, married to Guillermo Zapata
 Brock Davies: (2021–present), Scheana's husband
 Max Todd: (2020–present), Lisa Vanderpump and Ken Todd's son
 Kristina Kelly: (2013–2020, 2023–present), a former server at SUR

Former main cast 
 Kristen Doute: (2013–2020), a former server at SUR
 Stassi Schroeder: (2013–2020), a former server at SUR, married to Beau Clark
 Jax Taylor: (2013–2020), a former bartender at SUR, married to Brittany Cartwright
 Brittany Cartwright: (2015–2020), a former server at SUR, married to Jax Taylor
 Max Boyens: (2018–2020), a former general manager at Tom Tom
 Brett Caprioni: (2020), a former server at SUR and model
 Beau Clark: (2018–2020), a casting agent, married to Stassi Schroeder
 Dayna Kathan: (2018–2020), a former hostess at Tom Tom and a former server at SUR

Former recurring cast 
 Peter Madrigal: (2013–2020), a manager of SUR
 Mike Shay: (2013–2017), Scheana's ex-husband
 Laura-Leigh: (2013), a former server at SUR, and aspiring actress
 Frank Herlihy: (2013), a former bartender at SUR
 Vail Bloom: (2014), a former hostess at SUR
 Faith Stowers: (2015), James Kennedy's friend
 Billie Lee: (2017–2018), a former hostess at SUR
 Danica Dow: (2020), an assistant manager at SUR
 Brett Willis: (2020), a bartender at SUR
 Randall Emmett: (2018–2020), a film producer, father of Lala's child

Episodes

Broadcast history 
Vanderpump Rules regularly airs on Bravo in the United States; most episodes are approximately 43 minutes in length, and are broadcast in standard definition and high definition. Since its premiere, the series has altered airing on Tuesday, Wednesday and Thursday evenings and has been frequently shifted between 9:00 and 10:00 PM timeslots.

References

External links
 
 
 

2013 American television series debuts
2010s American reality television series
2020s American reality television series
English-language television shows
Television shows set in Los Angeles
Bravo (American TV network) original programming
The Real Housewives spin-offs
American television spin-offs